Bhattoji Dikshita was a 17th-century Maharashtrian Sanskrit grammarian, author of the , literally "Illumination of the established (position)".

He was active in a revival of the grammatical methods of Pāṇini, in his work arranging Pāṇini's sutras with a commentary for teaching purposes. It has been described as "an encyclopedia of the opinions and views of the great Sanskrit grammarians of antiquity" (Suryakant Bali).

The work was edited in three abridged versions by his student Varadarāja. He belonged to the Deshastha Brahmin Community

Siddhānta Kaumudī
Siddhānta Kaumudī is a celebrated Sanskrit commentary by Bhaṭṭoji Dīkṣita (early 17th century) on the Aṣṭādhyāyī and is believed to be more popular than Pāṇini’s work. It re-arranges the sūtras of Pāṇini under appropriate heads and offers exposition that is orderly and easy to follow.

The sutras are arranged in two parts – the first part deals with the rules of interpretation, sandhis, declensions, formation of feminines, case endings, compounds, secondary derivations and the second part with conjugation, primary suffixes, Vedic grammar and accents.

Commentaries on Siddhānta Kaumudī

Bālamanoramā
Bālamanoramā of Vāsudeva Dīkṣita's is one of the most celebrated commentary on Siddhanta Kaumudi. He goes into great detail explaining derivations and is thereby most useful to beginners (bāla, lit. "child").

Prauḍhamanoramā
Prauḍhamanoramā is an auto-commentary on Siddhānta Kaumudī by Bhaṭṭoji Dīkṣita. Both the Siddhānta Kaumudī and Prauḍhamanoramā are commented on by many others also.

Tattva Bodhinī
Tattva Bodhinī by Jñānendra Sarasvatī is a terser, more scholarly and demanding commentary, essentially a distillation of the Prauḍhamanoramā.

Laghuśabdenduśekhara

śabda Kaustubha

Editions:
 Baburam, "Samvat 1868, Sake 1733" (i.e. 1811)
 Bhuvaneshvari Ashrama (1904)
 Srisa Chandra Vasu, Vaman Das Vasu, Allahabad (1906)
 ed. P.V. Naganatha Sastri (1990), Motilal Banarsidass, 
 ed. S. C. Vasu, Motilal Banarsidass (2003)

External links
Siddhanta Kaumudi of Bhattoji Dikshita English Translation in 6 Volumes
http://laghusiddhanta.vedicsociety.org/

Sanskrit grammarians
17th-century Indian linguists
Year of birth missing
Year of death missing
Scholars from Maharashtra